Nir Lax (born August 10, 1994) is an Israeli footballer who plays for Hapoel Nof HaGalil, in the Israeli Premier League.

Honours
 Hapoel Tel Aviv
Israel State Cup: 2011–12
Liga Leumit: 2017–18

Notes

External links

 

1994 births
Living people
Israeli footballers
Association football midfielders
Hapoel Tel Aviv F.C. players
Beitar Tel Aviv Bat Yam F.C. players
Bnei Sakhnin F.C. players
FC Petrolul Ploiești players
Hapoel Nof HaGalil F.C. players
Israeli Premier League players
Liga Leumit players
Liga II players
Israeli expatriate footballers
Expatriate footballers in Romania
Israeli expatriate sportspeople in Romania
Footballers from Rishon LeZion